Buthidaung Township is a township of Maungdaw District in the Rakhine State of Myanmar (Burma). The principal town and administrative seat is Buthidaung.

The ratio of Rohingya to Rakhine nationals in Maungtaw and Buthidaung has become 94:6 in 2012.

There are three high schools, one high school,  three middle schools, three middle schools (branches), 20 postprimary schools and 122 primary schools in 2010–11.

External links
 "Buthidaung Township - Rakhine State" map, Myanmar Information Management Unit (MIMU)
 "Buthidaung Google Satellite Map" Maplandia

References

Townships of Rakhine State